
Lijia may refer to:

Places in China

Towns
Lijia, Jiangsu, in Changzhou, Jiangsu
Lijia, Heishan County, in Heishan County, Liaoning
Lijia, Anyue County, Sichuan
Lijia, Guangyuan, Sichuan
Lijia, Linshui County, Sichuan
Lijia, Nanchong, Sichuan
Lijia, Zhejiang, in Jiande, Zhejiang

Townships
Lijia Township, Fujian, in Qingliu County, Fujian
Lijia Township, Qinghai, in Haidong, Qinghai

Subdistricts
Lijia Subdistrict, Chongqing
Lijia Subdistrict, Dalian, Liaoning

People
 Xu Lijia, Chinese sailboat racer
 Lijia Zhang (Zhang Lijia), Chinese journalist

Other
Lijia Taoism, early school of religious Taoism